The 2007–08 Adelaide United FC season was the club's third season since the inception of the A-League. The club competed in the 2007–08 A-League and finished sixth on the ladder.

For the 2007–08 season Adelaide recruited ex-Socceroo Paul Agostino "marquee", Ivorian Jonas Salley and ex-Olyroo Kristian Sarkies. They also signed Issy Erdogan of Preston Lions. One of the success stories of the season was the signing of former Flamengo FC player Cássio on a free transfer from Brazilian club. Cássio, who joined from Santa Cruz FC, won the Club Champion award in his first season. Shaun Ontong and Matthew Mullen from the AIS, were also signed to replenish their defensive stocks after the departure of Kristian Rees, Adam van Dommele and Aaron Goulding.

The 2007–08 season was a season to forget for Adelaide as they battled a huge amount of player injury throughout the season. This effectively ended their finals hopes and it was the first time Adelaide had failed to make the top two in A-League history.

Adelaide United participated in the 2008 AFC Champions League after finishing runner-up in the 2006–07 regular season and finals series to Melbourne Victory. Adelaide was drawn into Group E, along with V-League and Super Cup winners Bình Dương F.C., CSL champions Changchun Yatai, and K-League winners Pohang Steelers.

In their opening match of the 2008 campaign, Adelaide United defeated Pohang 2–0 in Korea. United drew against Changchun 0–0 in their second game, defeated Bình Dương 2–1 in Vietnam and followed this up with a 4–1 victory in the return leg. In their final group tie at home, Adelaide defeated Pohang 1–0, setting up a deciding away tie against Changchun to determine the Group E winner. In Changchun, Adelaide withstood considerable pressure to achieve an historic 0–0 draw, thus becoming the first Australian team to ever progress to the knockout stage of the Asian Champions League.

Adelaide drew J-League and Emperor's Cup champions Kashima Antlers in a two legged quarter-final starting in Japan, where they managed a 1–1 draw. Adelaide captain Travis Dodd scored first in the opening half,  but right before halftime the score levelled when Robert Cornthwaite scored an own goal. In the return leg at the Hindmarsh Stadium a week later,  Adelaide became the first Australian team to progress to the semi-finals of the competition with a 1–0 win. Cornthwaite redeemed himself from his own goal in the first leg by scoring the only goal of the game midway through the second half.

Adelaide drew 2007 Uzbek League Runners-up FC Bunyodkor in the semi-final, after the Uzbeks knocked out Saipa F.C. in their quarter-final. In the first leg of the semi-final, Adelaide won 3–0 with Diego, Barbiero, and Cristiano (via a penalty) scoring. The match was witnessed by 16,998 fans at Hindmarsh Stadium.

In the second leg of the semi-finals Adelaide United lost 1–0 to FC Bunyodkor but went through to the final 3–1 on aggregate. Thus they became the first Australian team to make it to the final of Asia's premier club competition. In the two legged final, they took on Japanese team Gamba Osaka who deposed 2007 champions Urawa Red Diamonds in the other semi-final.

This result ensured that Adelaide would participate in the 2008 FIFA Club World Cup either as the AFC representatives or as the highest placed non-Japanese team – as the rules do not allow more than one Japanese team to participate.

Adelaide lost heavily over two legs to Gamba Osaka. The score was 3–0 to Gamba Osaka away and 2–0 to Osaka at home in Adelaide, the Japanese club winning 5–0 on aggregate.



Players

Transfers

Transfers in

Transfers out

Goal scorers

Competitions

Pre-season

A-League

League table

Matches

AFC Champions League

Group stage

Knockout stage

References

External links
 Official website

2007–08
2007–08 A-League season by team